The following list is of dinosaurs whose remains have been recovered from the North American subcontinent of Appalachia. During the Late Cretaceous, the Western Interior Seaway divided North America into two landmasses; one in the west named Laramidia and one in the east named Appalachia. Since they were separated from each other by many miles, the dinosaurs on each of them were very different. For example, nodosaurs were very common in Appalachia, but somewhat rare in Laramidia, and there were only specialized forms, such as Edmontonia and Panoplosaurus. This is an example of how isolated faunas develop differently.

List of Appalachian dinosaurs

References

Dinosaurs
.
Lists of animals of the United States
Lists of dinosaurs by landmass
Ecology of the Appalachian Mountains
Prehistory of the United States